"Rock Me Baby" is a 1985 song by Johnny Nash.  The song appeared on his Here Again album, released early the following year.

After the release, the song was a minor hit in the United Kingdom but did not chart on the U.S. Billboard Hot 100. It was a bigger success in other European nations like Germany and Switzerland.  Due to the lack of success in the United States, however, a music video was never shot for the song.

Track listings 
7" Single

 Rock Me Baby 3:58
 Love Theme From "Rock Me Baby" 4:25

Charts

Cover versions 

1986: Jamaika Thorsten und die Kokosnüsse (Komm wir düsen nach Jamaika (engl. Let's go to Jamaika))
1990: Ulli Bäer (Pack mi Baby)
1998: Wildecker Herzbuben
2009: Gentleman

References 

1985 singles
Johnny Nash songs
Reggae songs
1985 songs
London Records singles
Songs written by Johnny Nash